Rhodiginus is a genus of seed bugs in the tribe Drymini, erected by William Lucas Distant 1901.

References

External links
 

Drymini